The 1982 National Revenue Tennis Classic, also known as the Buckeye Championships, was a men's tennis tournament played on outdoor hardcourts at the Buckeye Boys Ranch in Grove City, a suburb of Columbus, Ohio in the United States that was part of the 1982 Volvo Grand Prix circuit. It was the 13th edition of the tournament and was held  from August 2 through August 8, 1982. First-seeded Jimmy Connors won the singles title and earned $20,000 first-prize money. It was his third singles title at the event after 1972 and 1973.

Finals

Singles
 Jimmy Connors defeated  Brian Gottfried 7–5, 6–0
 It was Connors' 6th singles title of the year and the 95th of his career.

Doubles
 Tim Gullikson /  Bernard Mitton defeated  Victor Amaya /  Hank Pfister 4–6, 6–1, 6–4

References

External links
 ITF tournament edition details

Buckeye Tennis Championships
Buckeye Tennis Championships
Buckeye Tennis Championships
Buckeye Tennis Championships